Paddy Moran may refer to:

Paddy Moran (Gaelic footballer) (born 1967), former Dublin Gaelic football player
Paddy Moran (hurler) (born 1939), Irish retired hurler
Paddy Moran (ice hockey) (1877–1966), professional ice hockey goaltender
Herbert Moran (1885–1945), Australian rugby union player, known as Paddy Moran

See also
Patrick Moran (disambiguation)